Zawata is a Palestinian town in the Nablus Governorate in northern West Bank, located 6 kilometers Northwest of Nablus. According to the Palestinian Central Bureau of Statistics (PCBS), the town had a population of 1,900 inhabitants in mid-year 2006.

Location
Zawata is located 4.4 km north of Nablus. It has Ijnisinya and ‘Asira ash Shamaliya to the east, Ijnisinya and An Naqura to the north, An Naqura and Beit Iba to the west, and Beit Iba and Nablus to the south.

History

Clermont-Ganneau found here tessera, probably from the Ptolemaic period.

Pottery sherds from the late Roman,   Byzantine, early Muslim and the Medieval eras have been found here.

Ottoman era
Zawata, like all of Palestine was incorporated into the Ottoman Empire in 1517.  In the 1596  tax registers, it was part of the nahiya ("subdistrict") of Jabal Sami, part of the larger Sanjak of Nablus. It had a population of 11 households, all Muslims. The inhabitants paid a fixed tax rate of 33,3% on agricultural products, including wheat, barley, summer crops, olive trees,  goats and beehives, in addition to occasional revenues and a press for olive oil or grape syrup, and a fixed tax for people of Nablus area; a total of 6,944  akçe.

In 1838, Edward Robinson noted Zawata ‘’on the hill-side,’’ part of the Jurat 'Amra district, south of Nablus.

In 1870, Victor Guérin noted  Zaouata as "a village on a high hill with white limestone slopes, some used for quarrying. The number of the inhabitants is 300. Below the hill a rich spring, 'Ain Zawata, supplies water to the village and irrigates a small valley. During our visit large herds of sheep were crowding around the spring."

In 1882, the PEF's Survey of Western Palestine (SWP) described  Zawata as:  "a village of moderate size, on a hill, with springs in the valley to the north."

British mandate era
In the  1922 census of Palestine conducted by the British Mandate authorities, Zawata had a  population of 214 Muslims, increasing  in  the 1931 census, to  247 Muslims, in 73  houses.

In the 1945 statistics the population was 330 Muslims,  while the total land area was 3,558 dunams, according to an official land and population survey. 
Of this, 13 dunams were for citrus and bananas, 334  for plantations and irrigable land, 1,842 for cereals, while 31 dunams were classified as built-up areas.

Jordanian era
In the wake of the 1948 Arab–Israeli War, and after the 1949 Armistice Agreements,   Zawata came  under Jordanian rule.

In 1961, the population of Zawata was  466.

Post 1967
Since the Six-Day War in 1967,  Zawata  has been under Israeli occupation, and according to the Israeli census of that year, the population of Zawata stood at 591, of whom 28 were registered as having come  from Israel.

After the 1995 accords, 31% of  Zawata land is defined as Area A land,  32%  is Area B land, while the remaining 37% is defined as Area C. Part of the village land has been confiscated for the construction of  an Israeli military road. This road also cuts off Zawata from its northernmost land.

References

Bibliography

External links
 Welcome  to Zawata
Survey of Western Palestine, Map 11:    IAA, Wikimedia commons  
Zawata Village Profile,  Applied Research Institute–Jerusalem (ARIJ)
Zawata, aerial photo, ARIJ
Development Priorities and Needs in Zawata, ARIJ

Nablus Governorate
Villages in the West Bank
Municipalities of the State of Palestine